Morning Star was launched at Calcutta, India, in 1813. She was wrecked on a coral reef south of Forbes Island, north Queensland in July 1814.

Morning Star arrived at Port Jackson on 10 June 1814 from Bengal carrying merchandise. She left for Bengal on 3 July.

On 30 September 1814 as the ship  was passing Booby Island she sighted a white flag flying on the island. Eliza sent a boat to investigate and found five survivors from the Morning Star that were stranded there. The survivors stated that on 25 September Captain Robert Smart and nine other crew had left the Island for Timor in the longboat. There is no record of their arrival in Timor. Excluding the party with Smart and the five rescued by Eliza, it appears that 22 crew drowned in the wreck of Morning Star.

Lloyd's List (LL) erroneously reported on 9 May 1815 that Morning Star, Smart, master, had wrecked on Booby Island in September while sailing from Port Jackson to Batavia. It also reported that the crew had been saved.

On 7 September 1818 the ships  and Mary rescued one of the ship's crew, an Indian lascar named Shaik Jamaul, from Murray Island (Mer), in northeast Torres Strait, where he had been living for four years.

Citations

References
 
 
 

1813 ships
British ships built in India
Shipwrecks of the Torres Strait
History of New South Wales
Sailing ships
Maritime incidents in 1814